Marcelo Demoliner and Matwé Middelkoop were the defending champions, but Middelkoop decide to participate in the 2021 Open Sud de France instead. Demoliner was pairing up with Santiago González, but they lost in the first round to Guillermo Durán and Andrés Molteni.

Rafael Matos and Felipe Meligeni Alves won the title, defeating Romain Arneodo and Benoît Paire in the final, 6–4, 6–1.

Seeds

Draw

Draw

References 

 Main draw

2021 ATP Tour
2021 Córdoba Open – Doubles
Copa